Tricholoma aeruginascens is an agaric fungus of the genus Tricholoma. It is found in Peninsular Malaysia, where it grows on the ground in secondary forests. It was described as new to science in 1994 by English mycologist E.J.H. Corner.

See also
List of Tricholoma species

References

aeruginascens
Fungi described in 1994
Fungi of Asia